Keith Lamarr Hamilton (born May 25, 1971) is a former American football defensive tackle for the New York Giants of the National Football League.  He played college football at the University of Pittsburgh and was selected in the 1992 NFL Draft.  Hamilton spent his entire 12-season career with the Giants and recorded 63 sacks, placing him fourth on the team's career sack list since sacks became an official statistic in 1982. "Hammer," as he was known, played in 173 games in a Giants uniform, tying him with Harry Carson for sixth on the franchise's all-time list.  He was named a Pro Bowl alternate in 2000, when he recorded ten sacks and the Giants reached Super Bowl XXXV.

Legal troubles
 On May 22, 2003, Hamilton, a resident of West Paterson (now Woodland Park, New Jersey) was arrested for possession of cocaine, possession of under 50 grams of marijuana, possession of drug paraphernalia, and consumption of alcohol in a vehicle. On Monday May 24, 2004, Hamilton pleaded guilty to cocaine possession.
 Hamilton was arrested at his home early Friday morning Feb. 3, 2006, after police signed two complaints against him, alleging that he repeatedly struck his 12-year-old son, Darius.  Hamilton was sentenced Friday, Aug. 11, to three years of probation after a plea deal for beating the boy.  Police say Hamilton hit his son with an electric cord and surge protector, picked him up by his throat and elbowed him in the chest Feb. 1 after seeing poor grades on a report card.

References

External links
NFL.com profile
Reports on criminal charges

1971 births
Living people
American football defensive ends
American football defensive tackles
New York Giants players
Pittsburgh Panthers football players
Players of American football from Paterson, New Jersey
People from Woodland Park, New Jersey
Ed Block Courage Award recipients